is a Japanese manga series written and illustrated by Kia Asamiya. The manga was originally serialized in Monthly Shōnen Jump and later moved to Ultra Jump at the magazines start. It was later adapted into a 26-episode anime television series which ran from October 1998 to March 1999 on TV Tokyo. In North America, the anime is licensed by ADV Films and the manga by Viz Media.

Plot
Steam City is a place where the only fuel source is coal, and the only means to produce energy is the steam engine. As the only source of energy, the steam engine has been the focus of technological advancement to the point where it can be substituted for any other form of power in modern technology. These same advancements also have given rise to Megamatons, large steam-powered robots. With the air of Steam City thick with fog and white smoke, thieves and criminals flourish with Megamatons as a common tool in their nefarious plans. It is here that the reader and/or viewer finds Narutaki, a young detective fighting for the peace of the city.

Characters

Son of the greatest detective in Steam City, Narutaki takes up the mantle after his parents' death. He is considered by some a child genius, but an annoyance by others. He is compassionate, and sometimes naive in his attitude towards both his citizen charges and the villains he pursues. Narutaki loves Steam City and vows to protect it from danger. His investigation style is similar to Sherlock Holmes. He uses a multi-purpose gun and various tools to aid his investigations. Despite his young age, he drinks tea and has an eye for pretty ladies. He also has a passion for toy models, and is described as "precocious" by Ling Ling.

Ling Ling is the youngest daughter of Dr. Hsu and the writer Feifer. A young nurse who owns the Megamaton, Goriki. She and Goriki become assistants of Narutaki after being tricked into helping Night Phantom. Much of her past is a mystery. She helps Narutaki in his investigations and looks after his health. Ling Ling is sensitive and caring to others but she can rise to the occasion. Her overly sentimental nature does put her in danger when she throws herself into things. She volunteers at the local hospitals since they are often understaffed. It is hinted in the manga that she may have feelings for Narutaki.

The Narutaki family butler and mechanic, he is the primary caretaker of Narutaki. Kawakubo also repairs Goriki. Kawakubo was the butler for Narutaki's father and is familiar with the older cases. He assists Narutaki in his lab work and research. He also manages Narutaki's affairs and looks after the house and its occupants.

The last Megamaton built by Dr. Hsu, Goriki means "great strength". According to the last wishes of the doctor, Dr. Hsu's brain is implanted inside Goriki's body. Unlike most Megamatons, Goriki does not need to be remote controlled. He provides the brunt of Narutaki Detective Agency's strength. He is capable of understanding speech and appears to respond to Ling Ling's emotions. Goriki is always ready to battle despite the reluctance of Ling Ling.

His true identity is Dr. Hart, a rival scientist of Dr. Hsu. He considers Dr. Hsu his enemy, and wishes to prove himself as the best. The pair disagreed on how Megamaton technology should be used. He often attacks Steam City with advanced Megamatons. He aims to rule the world with the aid of his Megamatons.

A detective with the Steam City Police Department, he is a good detective but can be a little over the top. He resents Narutaki's involvement in the cases. He is also very open about his love for Ling Ling, which is not returned.

Chief Inspector Yagami is Narutaki’s most trusted friend in the police force. He is not afraid of asking help from Narutaki, he also provides Narutaki with information pertaining to cases. He likes to think things through when solving a case.

"Phantom Knight" in the manga. A mysterious villain who has a past and a grudge with Narutaki and Narutaki's father. His father, the previous Phantom Knight, killed Narutaki's parents. He hates Steam City and vows to destroy it so he can avenge his father. Unlike most villains, he often creates elaborate plans to trick and kill Narutaki. His design and personality draw parallels to Batman.

A female thief who loves precious gems and jewellery. She often uses trickery and illusion to steal her prizes. She is very adept at disguising herself, which is a useful skill used for cat burglary. She also dislikes being called 'old'.
Machine Baron

A mechanic otaku, he steals items that are mechanical in nature. He is obsessed with Goriki and comes across more as comic relief or as a sweet loser rather than a true villain. He wears a metal mask with only his left eye exposed and has an army of mechanical henchmen who don’t always follow orders.

A criminal mastermind whose intelligence is equal to Narutaki, he often sets up cat-and-mouse games against the young detective and the Steam City police. Le Bled steals priceless and rare items in the belief that he is the only one to appreciate them. It is later revealed that he suffers from an incurable terminal illness and steals to live life to the fullest. Although he is a thief, he has a sense of honor. Le Bled bears a scar from a confrontation with Narutaki. He resides in a castle far away from Steam City and seems to be quite rich.

Ling Ling's older sister, she is the partner and lover of Le Bled. Unlike Ling Ling, she seems to have a disdain for helping the sick. She wears black as a sign of mourning for the patients that she has killed to end their suffering. Lang Lang looks after Le Bled and helps in his thefts. She worries that Le Bled is pushing himself too far and cares for him to the best of her ability. She inherited the design for Dr. Hsu’s last Megamaton Hiroh, which she had built for Le Bled.

Minor Characters
Pasta and Doria
Crimson Scorpion's henchmen, they are more cautious than their boss but follow her orders without question.
Anna Highend
A police officer who transferred from Electrical City so she could meet Narutaki. She is tall and good looking.
Dr. Mayerd
A scientist in energy technology, he repairs and maintains Goriki at his factory.
Soichiro Narutaki
Narutaki's father, and the previous owner of Narutaki Detective Agency. He is Narutaki's role model and was considered the best detective in Steam City. He and his wife lost their lives during an encounter with the original Night Phantom.
Wolf and Carlos
Two criminals from Techland that sometimes appear in Steam City to steal blueprints of new technologies to advance Techland's own power. Their well thought-out plans are generally ruined either by Narutaki or at times by their own carelessness.
Teng Shing
A giant hamster that Ling Ling brought home one day. It understands human speech and is adept at overpowering humans.

External links

1994 manga
1998 anime television series debuts
2000 Japanese novels
ADV Films
Kia Asamiya
Light novels
Seinen manga
Shōnen manga
Shueisha franchises
Shueisha manga
Sunrise (company)
TV Tokyo original programming
Viz Media manga
Xebec (studio)